Strange Itch is the independently released debut album by the band Strange Itch. Some of the band members went on to form Dumb Luck who eventually became The Used. Bass player Joel Pack went on to become the principal songwriter and guitar player in Broke City.

Track listing
"Play with Me" – 2:28
"I'm Free" – 5:41
"SPF" – 4:19
"Pig" – 3:37
"Big Brother" – 2:29
"Unity" – 2:16
"Funky Scrumptious" – 1:40
"Sneeches" – 2:56
"A.D.D." – 3:45
"Perfect Words" – 6:42
"Chucklehead" – 10:45
"I Want a Girl" (hidden track) – 2:13

Credits
Jeph Howard – vocals
Matt Brown – guitar
Joel Pack – bass
Branden Steineckert – drums

i

1998 albums